Berhampore Girls' College is a women's college in  Berhampore, in Murshidabad district, in the state of West Bengal in India. It is affiliated  to the University of Kalyani.

Departments

Science

Chemistry
Physics
Mathematics
Botany
Zoology
Physiology

Arts

Bengali
English
Sanskrit
History

Political Science
Philosophy
Economics
Sociology

Accreditation
The college is recognized by the University Grants Commission (UGC). It was accredited by the National Assessment and Accreditation Council (NAAC), and awarded B grade, an accreditation that has since then expired.

See also

References

External links
 
University of Kalyani
University Grants Commission
National Assessment and Accreditation Council

Educational institutions established in 1946
Colleges affiliated to University of Kalyani
Universities and colleges in Murshidabad district
Women's universities and colleges in West Bengal
1946 establishments in India
Berhampore